The 1995 European Mountain Running Trophy was the inaugural edition of the annual international mountain running competition between European countries, organised by the World Mountain Running Association. It was held on 15 July in Valleraugue, France, and featured 12-kilometre races for both men and women. In the men's race Austria's Helmut Schmuck was victorious with minor medallists Antonio Molinari and Davide Milesi leading Italy to the men's team title. Eroica Spiess led a Swiss sweep of the podium in the women's race.

The competition followed an unofficial European competition held in the previous year in Italy. The official name of the competition was European Mountain Running Trophy from 1995 to 2001 and then from 2002 the European Mountain Running Championships.

Results

Men

Individual

Team

Women

Individual

Team

References

External links
 European Mountain Running Championships History at EAA

European Mountain Running Championships
European Mountain Running Trophy, 1995
International athletics competitions hosted by France
European Mountain Running Championships
European Mountain Running Championships
European Mountain Running Trophy